Gregory Clark (born 19 September 1957) is an economic historian at the University of California, Davis.

Biography

Clark, whose grandfathers were migrants to Scotland from Ireland, was born in Bellshill, Scotland. He attended Holy Cross High School in Hamilton. In 1974 he and a fellow pupil Paul Fitzpatrick won the Scottish Daily Express schools debating competition. After school he earned his B.A. in economics and philosophy at King's College, Cambridge in 1979 and his PhD at Harvard University in 1985. He has also taught as an assistant professor at Stanford and the University of Michigan.

Clark is now a professor of economics, and was (until 2013) department chair, at the University of California, Davis. His areas of research are long term economic growth, the wealth of nations, the economic history of England and India, and social mobility.

In 2021, a talk by Clark, titled "For Whom the Bell Curve Tolls: A Lineage of 400,000 Individuals 1750–2020 Shows Genetics Determines Most Social Outcomes", was cancelled due to accusations of promoting eugenics.

Selected publications

Books 
 A Farewell to Alms (2007), a Malthusian look at economic history
 The Son Also Rises (2014), on social mobility.

Papers 
 "Genetically Capitalist?" (2007), University of California

References

External links
Gregory Clark's homepage

Living people
1957 births
People from Bellshill
Scottish economists
Scottish people of Irish descent
Socio-economic mobility
Economic historians
Harvard Graduate School of Arts and Sciences alumni
Stanford University Department of Economics faculty
University of Michigan faculty
University of California, Davis faculty
People educated at Holy Cross High School, Hamilton
Alumni of King's College, Cambridge
21st-century American economists